Loisey is a commune in the Meuse department in Grand Est in north-eastern France. Between 1973 and 2014 it was part of the commune Loisey-Culey. The Encyclopédiste Charles Millot was priest of Loisey from 1743 to 1769.

See also
Communes of the Meuse department

References

Communes of Meuse (department)